Tancharoen is a surname of Thai origin. Notable people with the surname include:

 Kevin Tancharoen (born 1984), American dancer, choreographer, television producer and director
 Maurissa Tancharoen (born 1975), American television producer, writer, actress, singer, lyricist and dancer
 Suchart Tancharoen (born 1958), Thai politician

Thai-language surnames